Verticordia humilis, commonly known as small featherflower,  is a flowering plant in the myrtle family, Myrtaceae and is endemic to the south-west of Western Australia. It is a small shrub with leafy branches and scattered, mostly red flowers hanging loosely near the ends of the branches.

Description

As they open, the flowers are surrounded by pink or red bracteoles that soon fall off. Flowering time can occur in almost any month but mostly from August to November.

Taxonomy and naming
Verticordia humilis was first formally described by George Bentham in 1867 and the description was published in Flora Australiensis Volume 3 from specimens collected by John Septimus Roe. The specific epithet (humilis) is a Latin word meaning "lowly" or "small" referring to the stature of the plant.

When Alex George reviewed the genus in 1991, he placed this species in subgenus Verticordia, the only species in section Recondita.

Distribution and habitat
This verticordia usually grows in sand, often over gravel, loam or clay, often with other species of verticordia, in heath and shrubland. It occurs in the area between Kukerin, Ongerup and the Frank Hann National Park with some populations occurring as far east as Esperance, in the Esperance Plains, Jarrah Forest and Mallee biogeographic regions.

Ecology
It has been suggested that the arrangement of the petals and sepals of the pendulous flowers make it difficult for insects like ants to reach the nectar produced by them and that it is likely that they are pollinated by birds or small mammals.

Conservation
Verticordia humilis is classified as "not threatened" by the Western Australian Government Department of Parks and Wildlife.

Use in horticulture
This verticordia has been propagated from cuttings but these have proven difficult to grow on and to establish in the garden.

References

humilis
Rosids of Western Australia
Eudicots of Western Australia
Plants described in 1867